José Antônio Aparecido Tosi Marques (born 13 May 1948) is a Brazilian prelate of the Roman Catholic Church. He has been serving as the Archbishop of Fortaleza since his appointing on 13 January 1999.

Biography 

Born in 1948, first of six brothers, he was ordained priest in 1974. He previously served as auxiliary bishop of the archdiocese of São Salvador da Bahia.

Bibliography 
 Conferência Nacional dos Bispos do Brasil. Membros da CNBB. Brasília, 1997. 337p.

References

Sources 
 Official website of the Archdiocese of Fortaleza 

1948 births
Living people
People from Jaú
21st-century Roman Catholic archbishops in Brazil
Roman Catholic bishops of São Salvador da Bahia